"Sad Girlz Luv Money" (stylized in all caps) is a song by Ghanaian-American singers Amaarae and Moliy, released as a single in 2020 from Amaarae's debut album The Angel You Don't Know. It achieved viral popularity on TikTok after a remix with American singer Kali Uchis was released on September 16, 2021, appearing on various international charts, including reaching number 80 on the US Billboard Hot 100.

Content
"Sad Girlz Luv Money" is an Afropop song that talks about "money as a means of personal growth and how sometimes one can't control the desire to dance".

Charts

Certifications

Release history

References

2020 singles
2020 songs
2021 singles
Kali Uchis songs